Verdad oculta is a Colombian police crime drama television series deloveped by Dramax for RCN Televisión that premiered on this network on 1 July 2020. The drama is based on the book by Germán Castro Caycedo, Una verdad oscura. It is written by Verónica Triana and Pedro Miguel Rozo, and directed by Rodrigo Triana and Jorge Alí Triana.

The series was acquired by Sony Pictures Television for worldwide distribution. It is filmed in places like Urabá, Chocó, Costa Atlantica, La Dorada, Medellín and Bogotá.

The series is stars Verónica Orozco as Diana Manrique, and Rodrigo Candamil as Raúl Ceballos.

Cast 
 Verónica Orozco as Diana Manrique
 Rodrigo Candamil as Raúl Ceballos
 Andrés Suárez as Jorge Ramírez
 Andrés Castañeda as Uriel Zurria
 Sebastián Sierra as Gerónimo
 Juan Pablo Barragán as Dubán Correa "Alambres"
 Brenda Hanst as Irma Castaño
 Gustavo Angarita as Manuel Sepúlveda
 Pilar Álvarez as Cecilia Tamayo
 Víctor Hugo Morant as Procurador Fernando
 Eduardo López as Julián Botero
 María Barreto as Sandra Castañeda
 Jerónimo Cantillo as Yéison Vergara
 Brian Moreno as Fabio Montoya "Mesías"
 Andrés Felipe Martínez as Camilo Tapia
 Rodolfo Silva as Jhonny Zurria
 Nelson Camayo as William Gallo
 Julio Pachón as Alcides Montoya
 Brian Moreno as Fabio Montoya
 Lina Castrillón as Yolima Ferrero
 Valentina Duque as Zully Berrio
 Kevin Bury as Junior Zurria
 Pedro Roda as Comandante
 Mauricio Mejía as Jimmy Henao
 Sandra Reyes as Belén Caicedo
 Emilia Ceballos as Mayerly Garzón
 Valentina Afanador as Jazmín Berrio
 Ana María Durán as María Angélica Tamayo

Television rating 
  
}}

Episodes

References 

Colombian television series
Television series about organized crime
Works about organized crime in Colombia
2020 telenovelas
2020 Colombian television series debuts
2020 Colombian television series endings